The Palestine sent participants to the 16th Asian Games in Guangzhou, China.

Aquatics

Athletics

Boxing

Football

Table Tennis

Volleyball

Wweightlifting

Wrestling

Nations at the 2010 Asian Games
2010
Asian Games